Lelo Prado (born November 5, 1962) is the former head baseball coach at the University of South Florida. Hired in 2006, he guided the Bulls to a 36–24 record in his inaugural season. In 24 years as a collegiate coach, he has posted a 763–580–2 record. He led the Bulls to a 9–0 start in 2006, and South Florida was ranked 30th in the nation for that week. Prado left the position following the 2014 season. He is now a deputy athletic director at South Florida.

Prior to coaching at USF, he served as the head coach 11 seasons at the University of Louisville. Prado also coached for seven seasons at the University of Tampa, where he won two Division II national championships, in 1992 and 1993. In 2002, he took Louisville to its first ever NCAA tournament appearance, and earned Conference USA coach of the year honors. He had seven 30-win seasons at Louisville, also a school record.

Head coaching record

References

1962 births
Living people
Hillsborough Hawks baseball players
Louisville Cardinals baseball coaches
South Florida Bulls baseball coaches
Tampa Spartans baseball coaches
Tampa Spartans baseball players
Baseball players from Havana
Hillsborough Hawks baseball coaches
Baseball players from Tampa, Florida